Bellona was launched at Lancaster in 1799. She was a West Indiaman that made one voyage as a whaler. She disappeared in 1809 as she was returning to England from Jamaica.

Career
Bellona first appeared in Lloyd's Register (LR) in 1799 with W.Croft, master, Stuart, owner, and trade Lancaster–Barbados. Captain William Croft acquired a letter of marque on 14 December 1799.

The Register of Shipping for 1804 showed Bellona with Munro, master, Hill, owner, and trade London–Southern Fishery.

Captain Mark Monro received a letter of marque on 7 July 1803. Captain Mark Monro (or Munro, or Monroe), sailed from England on 20 July 1803, bound for the Isle of Desolation. Bellona engaged in whaling and sealing in 1803–1804 and was reported to have been "all well" in February 1804. Bellona returned on 10 July 1804.

The Register of Shipping for 1806 showed Bellonas master changing from M.Munro to J.Thompson, her owner from J.Hill to "Captain", and her trade from Southern Fishery to London–Jamaica. Later issues of LR and RS gave the name of her owner as Auldjo.

Loss
Bellona, Thompson, master, was one of three ships that had left Jamaica on 27 July 1809 in a convoy and that were last heard from on 27 August 1809.

See also
List of people who disappeared mysteriously at sea

Notes

Citations

References
 
  

1799 ships
1800s missing person cases
Age of Sail merchant ships of England
Maritime incidents in 1809
Missing ships
Ships built in England
Ships lost with all hands
Shipwrecks in the Atlantic Ocean
People lost at sea
Whaling ships